Melaleuca brevisepala is a shrub in the myrtle family, Myrtaceae and is endemic to the north-west of Grande Terre, the main island of New Caledonia where it is known from only a few locations. It is one of only a few members of its genus to occur outside Australia.

Description
It has a highly branched crown and the branchlets are covered with fine white hairs but become glabrous with age. The leaves also become glabrous as they develop.

The flowers occur on the ends of the branches and in some leaf axils near the end but the branch usually continues to grow after flowering.

Taxonomy and naming
Melaleuca brevisepala was first formally described in 1992 by John Dawson in Flore de la Nouvelle-Calédonie et Dépendances as Callistemon brevisepalus. In 1998 it was transferred to the genus Melaleuca by Lyndley Craven and John Dawson in the journal Adansonia. The specific epithet (brevisepala) is from the Latin words brevis meaning "short" and sepalum meaning "sepal" referring to the short calyx lobes.

Distribution and habitat
This melaleuca is found in only a few location in the north-west of Grande Terre. It grows in maquis in loose, eroded laterite and soil on ultramafic rock.

References 

brevisepala
Flora of New Caledonia
Plants described in 1992
Taxa named by John Dawson (botanist)